The University of Ruhuna ( (Ruhuṇa Viśvavidyālaya, Rohana sarasaviya),) is a public university in Matara, Sri Lanka.

It is the only university in the southern region of Sri Lanka (also referred to as the Kingdom of Ruhuna). It was established by a special presidential decree on 1 September 1978 as Ruhuna University College and upgraded to a full-fledged university on 1 February 1984 by a university order. It is informally known as Ruhuna University or simply Ruhuna.

The university is organized into ten faculties throughout the southern province of Sri Lanka. Its  main campus is located in the Wellamadama complex in Matara. The Agriculture and Technology faculties are in Kamburupitiya (Matara), while the Engineering, Medicine, and Allied Health Sciences faculties are in Galle. Its LKR 5.49 billion financial endowments are used for academic and research purposes of the university. It operates the Ruhuna Library, which is one of the largest academic and research library systems in Sri Lanka. The Ruhuna University Library System is centered in the main library at the Wellamadama main campus and comprises nearly four other libraries holding over 200,000 volumes.

History

The idea of a University of Ruhuna was proposed by the Cabinet Minister of Education & Higher Education at the time, Dr. Nissanka Wijeyeratne.

Inauguration of University college
The enactment of the Universities Act No. 46 of 1978 enabled the University Grants Commission to establish the Ruhuna University College. As a result, on 27 August 1978, the Prime Minister J. R. Jayawardene declared open the Ruhuna University College at Meddawatta, Matara, with Prof. Mervyn W. Thenabadu as its drector.

Campus to University status 
The Ruhuna University College shifted to its new premises in 1984 following which it was elevated to full university status. The new location was selected for the main campus at Wellamadama, two kilometers from Matara facing the Matara-Kataragama main road. Professor G. P. Samarawickrama was the first vice-chancellor of the university. Hon. Ronnie De Mel inaugurated the university after being elevated from campus to university status in 1984. During the past 25 years, it has witnessed considerable progress and development in the academic, research and outreach spheres with substantial improvement in intellectual and infrastructure resources and has emerged as a leader of higher education in Sri Lanka. To date, it has produced about 50,000 graduates and over 75 postgraduates.

Governance and administration

The University of Ruhuna is a state university and depends on the government for much of its annual grant, which is provided by the University Grants Commission (UGC). Due to this, its administration is heavily influenced by the UGC. Undergraduate education is completely free. The governance of the university is under the provisions of the Universities Act No. 16 of 1978 and the Universities (Amendment) Act No. 7 of 1985 along with its own by-laws.

Officers of the university
Chancellor
The chancellor is the head of the university and awards all degrees, although most duties are carried out by the vice-chancellor. The appointment is made by the president of Sri Lanka, to a distinguished person in academics, clergy, or civil society. The chancellor is Venerable Akuratiye Nanda Thero.

Vice-chancellor
Day-to-day management of the university is undertaken by the vice-chancellor, appointed by the president of Sri Lanka. The current vice-chancellor is Prof Sujeewa Amarasena.

Past chancellors and vice-chancellors

Chancellors
 Ven.Paravahera Pannaseeha Mahanayaka Thero
 Aththudawe Sri Rahula Mahanayake Thera 
 Athi pujya Rajakiya Panditha Pallaththara Sri Sumanajothi Na Himi
 Ven. Dr. Akuratiye Nanda Thero (Current Chancellor)

Vice-chancellors
 G. P. Samarawickrama
 S. Pinnaduwage
 Chandrasiri Niriella
 Ranjith Senaratne
 Susirith Mendis
 Gamini Senanayake
 Sujeewa Amarasena (Current Vice Chancellor)

Campus

Architectural landscape

A new building complex for the university was designed by the world-renowned architect Geoffrey Bawa and was constructed at Wellamadama with a unique architectural landscape.

The 30-hectare site straddled three steep hills, the westernmost overlooking the sea and separated from the other two by a low-lying valley that carried the main road from Matara to Hambantota. Architects placed the vice-chancellor's lodge and a guest house on the western hill and flooded the intervening valley to create a buffer between the road and the main campus. He then wrapped the buildings of the science faculty around the northern hill and those of the arts faculty around the southern hill, using the depression between them for the library and other central facilities.

Geoffery Bawa's architecture for Ruhuna
In Geoffery Bawa's architecture, the central role of geography must be a highlight. The buildings as they are conceived are influenced by the "character of the natural terrain, the vegetation, the potential for developing vistas out into the landscape and hence light and shade and of course the related and ever-present aspect of climate". In the Ruhuna campus construction are intimately tied to the topography and the territory they occupy.

Rabindranath Tagore Memorial Auditorium
The Rabindranath Tagore Memorial Auditorium is the largest auditorium in any of the universities in Sri Lanka.

Faculties

The university has ten faculties: Agriculture, Engineering, Fisheries and Marine Sciences & Technology, Humanities and Social Sciences, Management and Finance, Medicine, Science, Graduate studies, Technology and Allied Health Sciences.

The university has responded to the needs of the country and established two new faculties — 'Management and Finance' and 'Fisheries and Marine Science' — the first of its kind in Sri Lanka. Thus, the university has as many faculties as the University of Peradeniya, the largest in Sri Lanka.

The main campus is at Matara. The faculties of Engineering and Medicine are at Hapugala and Karapitiya, about 5 km from Galle city center. The Faculty of Agriculture is at Mapalana, 16 km north of Matara and 2 km south of Kamburupitiya.

Research
The University of Ruhuna undertakes research, mostly with other universities, government organisations, semi-governmental organisations and non-governmental organisations. The research is funded by both Sri Lankan and foreign entities.

Publications
The University of Ruhuna established during the same year launched Rohana, a multidisciplinary journal devoted to publishing research articles related to applied & natural sciences, management & social sciences, and medical sciences in 1985. The first issue of the journal Tropical Agricultural Research and Extension (TARE) was launched by the University of Ruhuna in 1998, which was followed by the government publication the Annals of the Sri Lanka Department of Agriculture in 1999, providing additional venues for publishing articles on agriculture. The Journal of the Faculty of Humanities & Social Sciences commenced in 1998, providing an additional venue for research output in the area of humanities and social sciences. The University of Ruhuna publishes some of the key academic journals in the country.
Journal of the University of Ruhuna
Ruhuna Journal of Management and Finance
Ruhuna Journal of Science
Tropical Agricultural Research and Extension (TARE)
Rohana
Ruhuna Journal of Medicine
Rohana is a multidisciplinary refereed journal devoted to publishing high-quality research articles related to the applied and natural sciences, management and social sciences, and medical sciences. It commenced publication in 1985.

Library
The university has 5 libraries. The Ruhuna University Library is the central research library, which holds over 0.2 million volumes. It is a legal deposit library, therefore it is entitled to request a free copy of every book published in Sri Lanka. In addition to the University Library and its dependents, almost every faculty or department has a specialised library; for example, Agriculture, Medical, Allied Health Science and Engineering faculty libraries are at the Mapalana, Karapitiya, and Hapugala campuses.

The library holds about 200,000 books and about 300 journals (foreign and local). These resources are available in print and electronic formats. Services include reference, lending, interlibrary loan, current awareness services, workshops and maintaining library website with links to resources for which the library have subscribed as well as those available free. The library website also provides access to the CD collection and the Online Public Access catalog. According to library statistics, annual circulation of resources is more than 123,000.

Student life

Financial aid 
Each year ten financially disadvantaged students from Civil and Environmental Engineering program are entitled to a special scholarship sponsored by Ceylon Steel Corporation

References

External links
University of Rahuna Website 

 
Buildings and structures in Matara, Sri Lanka
Educational institutions established in 1978
Education in Southern Province, Sri Lanka
Statutory boards of Sri Lanka
Universities in Sri Lanka
1978 establishments in Sri Lanka
Geoffrey Bawa buildings
Deposit libraries
Engineering universities and colleges in Sri Lanka